Nicrophorus scrutator is a burying beetle described by Émile Blanchard in 1842. It occurs in South America, with records from Peru, Bolivia, and northern Argentina.

References

Silphidae
Beetles of South America
Beetles described in 1842
Taxa named by Émile Blanchard